Events from the year 2023 in Taiwan, Republic of China. This year is numbered Minguo 112 according to the official Republic of China calendar.

Incumbents 

 President: Tsai Ing-wen
 Vice President: Lai Ching-te
 Premier: Su Tseng-chang, Chen Chien-jen
 Vice Premier: Shen Jong-chin, Cheng Wen-tsan

Events 

 8 January – 2023 Taiwanese legislative by-elections
 4 March – Nantou legislative seat by-election.

Deaths 

 1 January – Kuo Nan-hung, 86, Taiwanese politician, minister of transportation and communications (1987–1990) and president of the National Chiao Tung University (1979–1987)
6 January – Shen Lyu-shun, 73, Taiwanese diplomat.
27 January – Ting Chiang, 86, Taiwanese actor (Four Loves, The Bold, the Corrupt, and the Beautiful).
5 February – Hsing Yun, 95, Taiwanese Buddhist monk (Fo Guang Shan).
16 February – Chen Yu-an, 28, Taiwanese rower (Dragon boat at the 2018 Asian Games).

References 

 
Taiwan
Taiwan
2020s in Taiwan
Years of the 21st century in Taiwan